Groseclose is a populated place and unincorporated community in Smyth County, Virginia, United States.

References 

Unincorporated communities in Smyth County, Virginia
Unincorporated communities in Virginia